Sochy  is a village in the administrative district of Gmina Zwierzyniec  within Zamość County, Lublin Voivodeship. Germans murdered about 200 people on June the 1st, 1943 during the Germanisation of the region, which caused Zamość Uprising. Polish writer Anna Janko is a daughter of one of survivors, she describes the tragedy in her book Mała Zagłada.

References

Sochy